The American Legion State Forest Trails is a system of Blue-Blazed hiking trails in the Pleasant Valley section of Barkhamsted, Connecticut. The trails, which collectively total  in length, are entirely within American Legion State Forest.

The American Legion State Forest Trails consist of two official "Blue-Blazed" hiking trails:
 Henry Buck Trail (2.3 miles)
 Turkey Vulture Trail (0.88 mile)

Trail description

The American Legion State Forest Trails are primarily used for hiking, backpacking, picnicking, and in the winter, snowshoeing.

Portions of the trails are suitable for, and are used for, cross-country skiing and geocaching. Site-specific activities enjoyed along the route include bird watching, hunting (very limited), fishing, horseback riding,  bouldering and rock climbing (limited).

Trail route

Trail communities

The official Blue-Blazed American Legion State Forest Trails pass through land completely located within Barkhamsted in the Paradise Valley area near the Riverton area.

Landscape, geology, and natural environment

History and folklore

The Blue-Blazed American Legion State Forest Trails were created by the Connecticut Forest and Park Association.

Origin and name

Historic sites

Folklore

Hiking the trail

The two trails are blazed with blue rectangles. Trail descriptions are available from a number of commercial and non-commercial sources, and a complete guidebook is published by the Connecticut Forest and Park Association

The trails are regularly maintained, and are considered easy hiking, with very few sections of rugged and moderately difficult hiking.

Much of the trail is close to public roads.  There are camping facilities in American Legion State Forest but camping is controlled and must be arranged.

Weather along the route is typical of Connecticut. Conditions on exposed ridge tops and summits may be harsher during cold or stormy weather. Lightning is a hazard on exposed summits and ledges during thunderstorms. Snow is common in the winter and may necessitate the use of snowshoes. Ice can form on exposed ledges and summits, making hiking dangerous without special equipment.

Biting insects can be bothersome during warm weather. Parasitic deer ticks (which are known to carry Lyme disease) are a potential hazard.

The trail is adjacent to, or is on lands where hunting and the use of firearms are permitted.
Wearing bright orange clothing during the hunting season (Fall through December) is recommended.

Conservation and maintenance of the trail corridor

See also
 Blue-Blazed Trails
 Barkhamsted

References

Further reading

External links
Specific to this trail:
 CT Museum Quest Article on the American Legion State Forest Trails

Government links:
 State of Connecticut American Legion and Peoples State Forest website
 State of Connecticut American Legion and Peoples State Forest Letterbox website
 State of Connecticut American Legion and Peoples State Forest Hiking Map
 State of Connecticut American Legion State Forest Camping Map
 State of Connecticut American Legion State Forest Camping Information

 

Blue-Blazed Trails
Protected areas of Litchfield County, Connecticut
Barkhamsted, Connecticut